Yashodhar Mathpal (born 1939) is an Indian archaeologist, painter, curator, Gandhian and Rock art conservationist. He is most known for his study of cave art, especially in Bhimbetka rock shelters, Barechhina (Uttarakhand) and Kerala. He founded the Folk Culture Museum (Lok Sanskriti Sangrahalaya) in Bhimtal, Nainital district, in 1983.

He was awarded the Padma Shri, fourth-highest civilian honour by Government of India in 2006.

Early life and background

Born in village Naula in Bhikiyasain Tehsil of Almora district of Uttarakhand to Haridutt Mathpal and Kanti Devi, Mathpal received his primary education local Primary School from his native village, thereafter he did his further schooling from Manila village, Mission Intercollege, Ranikhet and completed his schooling from Vikramajit Singh Sanatan Dharma College, Kanpur.

He did his B.A. from J. N. P. G. College, Lucknow, followed by M.A. degree in drawing and painting from Agra University and a Ph.D in Archaeology from University of Pune.

Career
He established the Folk Culture Museum (Lok Sanskriti Sangrahalaya) in Bhimtal, Nainital district, in 1983. The museum houses artifacts, folk paintings, rock art and prehistoric objects. The museum also documents oral and written traditions and folklore of the region, besides providing training in rare traditional arts and crafts. He takes care of the museum himself, and has spent all his life's earnings on it.

In 2012, he facilitated by Vice President of India at the "International Conference on Rock Art", organized by the Indira Gandhi National Centre for the Arts, in New Delhi.

Bibliography

References 

1939 births
Living people
20th-century Indian archaeologists
Indian male painters
Indian curators
People from Almora district
Rock art in India
Gandhians
Recipients of the Padma Shri in arts
20th-century Indian painters
Painters from Uttarakhand